Musselfork Township is a township in Chariton County, in the U.S. state of Missouri.

Musselfork Township was established in 1840, and named after nearby Mussel Fork creek.

References

Townships in Missouri
Townships in Chariton County, Missouri